Daniel Ben Murphy (born 18 March 1977) is an English former professional footballer who played as a midfielder.

Having begun his career at Crewe Alexandra in 1993, he moved to Liverpool in 1997, where he won a treble of the League Cup, FA Cup and UEFA Cup in 2001. During his time at Liverpool he scored the winning goal against arch rivals Manchester United at Old Trafford in three Premier League games, each a 1–0 win. After brief spells at Charlton Athletic and Tottenham Hotspur he joined Fulham, which he helped reach the 2010 UEFA Europa League Final, and ended his career at Blackburn Rovers. He served as captain at his last two clubs.

Murphy made nine appearances for the England team from his debut in 2001, scoring once. Since retiring, he has been a regular analyst on the BBC programme Match of the Day.

Club career

Early career
Born in Chester, Cheshire, Murphy started out as a trainee at Crewe Alexandra. Murphy has always praised the role of Crewe manager Dario Gradi in his footballing education, considering him as his mentor.

In November 2016, as the United Kingdom football sexual abuse scandal erupted, Murphy also strongly defended Gradi's reputation.

Gradi always rated the footballing brain of Murphy, and used to send him on scouting missions even as a trainee. Murphy made his debut as a 16-year-old substitute in December 1993, coming off the bench at Valley Parade against Bradford City in a Football League Trophy tie. Murphy scored on his home debut for Crewe, the winner in a 4–3 win against Preston North End. Murphy generally played as a deep-lying forward for Crewe, scoring several spectacular long range and set piece goals. While at Gresty Road, Murphy formed a prolific partnership with striker Dele Adebola.

Many top flight clubs had their eye on Murphy before his eventual move to Liverpool. Before he left, he helped Crewe reach the second tier of English football for the first time since 1896, as Crewe finished third in Division Two, before going on to defeat Brentford 1–0 at Wembley in the 1997 play-off final.

Liverpool

After signing for Liverpool in 1997, for an initial fee of £1.5 million, he made his debut as a substitute on the opening day of the 1997–98 season in a draw with Wimbledon. However, he did not break into the first team squad immediately and, after making just one league appearance for the club during the following season, he returned to Crewe for a successful period on loan, during which he helped save his old club from relegation. After the loan period ended, he looked set to be sold but he went on to become a first-team regular at Anfield.

Though naturally a central midfield player, Murphy often played as a wide midfielder due to the fierce competition for places, particularly from Steven Gerrard and Dietmar Hamann. Murphy's career at Liverpool included a cup treble in 2001 (where Liverpool won the League Cup, FA Cup and UEFA Cup), a Premier League second-place finish in 2002 and a second League Cup in 2003. During the 2001–02 season, when he established himself as a key member of the side, Liverpool's assistant manager Phil Thompson praised Murphy, citing his versatility and describing him as 'probably the most tactically aware player that we have.' Although the 2002–03 season was overall a disappointing one for Liverpool, with the club slumping to fifth in the table after a lengthy winless run in mid-winter, Murphy had a fine individual campaign which saw him score 12 goals and be voted the supporters' player of the season. He also started the 2003 Football League Cup Final as Liverpool defeated Manchester United, having missed the 2001 final due to injury.

He developed a habit of scoring the deciding goal in 1–0 wins against Manchester United at Old Trafford, a feat he achieved three times in four seasons (2000–01, 2001–02 and 2003–04).

Charlton Athletic
Murphy signed for Charlton Athletic from Liverpool for £2.5 million on a four-year contract in August 2004. In his first season at Charlton, Murphy struggled to recapture the form that he had shown at Liverpool. However, in the first three months of the 2005–06 season he emerged as a viable option for England once more, and also won the September player of the month award, scoring several goals along the way.

Tottenham Hotspur
On 31 January 2006, Murphy was transferred to Tottenham Hotspur for £2 million. He appeared only fleetingly in the remaining games of the season. Murphy scored his first Tottenham goal in the 2–1 defeat of Portsmouth on 1 October 2006 after only 39 seconds of the game.

He scored his second goal for Tottenham when Jermain Defoe was injured in a pre-match warm-up against Newcastle United; manager Martin Jol brought Murphy into a 4–5–1 formation. Murphy scored with a scissors kick which hit Steven Taylor in the face, deflecting it past goalkeeper Shay Given. After several months, the FA decided to take the goal away from Murphy and put it down as an own-goal for Taylor.

Murphy was unable to establish himself as a regular at Tottenham, but made clear later that despite reports in the media, there was no disagreement between him and Jol.

Fulham

Fulham took over Murphy's Tottenham contract on 31 August 2007.

Murphy cemented himself as a regular starter, kept his place in the team throughout the season and scored six goals in 43 matches. One goal, a rare header scored on 11 May 2008, gave Fulham a 1–0 win away at Portsmouth and ensured their Premier League survival at the expense of Birmingham City and Reading; the goal was scored as manager Roy Hodgson prepared to substitute Murphy. Following the match, Murphy highlighted Hodgson's "key role" in the team's avoiding relegation. Murphy signed a new one-year contract, with an option for a further year, at the end of the season, and was appointed club captain for 2008–09.

On 9 November 2008, Murphy scored his 100th goal at club level from the penalty spot, as Fulham beat Newcastle United 2–1. Murphy scored another penalty as, for the first time in 45 years, Fulham beat title-chasing Manchester United at home.

The year's option on Murphy's contract was taken up during the season, but in August 2009, amid reported interest from clubs including Birmingham City and Stoke City, he signed another extension, until June 2011. Murphy missed two months in the early part of the season with a knee ligament problem, but went on to captain Fulham to their first European final. They eliminated opponents including Juventus, defending champions Shakhtar Donetsk, Bundesliga champions Wolfsburg, and Hamburg to reach the 2010 UEFA Europa League Final. Ahead of the semifinal, Murphy said that just reaching the final "would be one of the greatest achievements of our history". Fulham lost 2–1 to Atlético Madrid to a goal scored just four minutes from the end of extra time.

The 2010–11 season started without Hodgson, who left for Liverpool, and was replaced by Mark Hughes. In October, Murphy made a controversial comment about managers responsible for dangerous tackles made by players. His comment was supported by some, but received heavy criticisms from other managers. In response to these criticisms, Murphy said his comments "were blown out of all proportion". In late-January 2011, Murphy signed another contract extension that will extend until 2012. Just one day after signing a new contract, Murphy scored his first goal of the season and then another, as Fulham beat his former club Tottenham 4–0 in the fourth round of the FA Cup. Murphy was praised by Manager Mark Hughes for helping the club turn things around and avoid relegation.
 
Ahead of the 2011–12 season, Murphy believed he could play a major role and declared himself "fitter than ever". After making forty-nine appearances and scoring seven times in all competitions, he was released by Fulham at the end of the 2011–12 season as he and Martin Jol, who had replaced Hodgson's successor, Hughes, could not agree on a contract extension. In his last season at Craven Cottage, Murphy created more goalscoring chances than any other player in the top-flight.

Blackburn Rovers

On 25 June 2012, Blackburn Rovers confirmed the signing of Murphy on a two-year contract. He was unveiled on 2 July 2012, wearing the same number 13 squad number that he wore throughout his career, therefore also taking Mark Bunn's number. Murphy said that he moved to Blackburn Rovers for first team football and said it was the right time to leave Fulham.

He scored his first goal for Blackburn in a 2–2 draw with Huddersfield Town on 6 November 2012. His second goal came in the FA Cup against Bristol City on 5 January 2013. In March 2013, Murphy was succeeded as Blackburn captain by Scott Dann.

On 1 July 2013, Murphy had his contract terminated by mutual consent despite being willing to stay at the club for another season. While at the club, Murphy was praised by manager Gary Bowyer for his assistance during Bowyer's management career at Blackburn Rovers.

International career
Murphy was capped nine times for England and scored one goal. He made his debut in a friendly match against Sweden in November 2001, and scored his only international goal in a 4–0 victory over Paraguay in April 2002. Having been called up as a replacement for injured club teammate Steven Gerrard, he was set to play at the 2002 World Cup, but had to withdraw from the squad after he suffered a metatarsal injury similar to that which had affected England teammates David Beckham and Gary Neville in the run-up to the tournament.

Post-playing career
On 18 August 2013, Murphy appeared as a new pundit on the BBC show Match of the Day. He announced his retirement as a player on 10 October 2013, with the intention of continuing his media work and completing his coaching badges.

He has established a career as a pundit on the UK radio station Talksport.

Personal life

He is the nephew of former professional footballers Paul Futcher, Graham Futcher and Ron Futcher, and is the cousin of Ben Futcher.

Murphy married actress Joanna Taylor in 2004. They have two children. The couple separated in 2017.

Career statistics

Club

Honours
Crewe Alexandra
Football League Second Division play-offs: 1996–97

Liverpool
FA Cup: 2000–01
Football League Cup: 2000–01, 2002–03
FA Community Shield: 2001
UEFA Cup: 2000–01
UEFA Super Cup: 2001

Individual
PFA Team of the Year: 1996–97 Second Division
Liverpool Player of the Season: 2002–03
Premier League Player of the Month: November 2001, September 2005

References

External links

LFChistory.net player profile

1977 births
Sportspeople from Chester
Living people
English people of Irish descent
Association football midfielders
English footballers
England under-21 international footballers
England international footballers
Crewe Alexandra F.C. players
Liverpool F.C. players
Charlton Athletic F.C. players
Tottenham Hotspur F.C. players
Fulham F.C. players
Blackburn Rovers F.C. players
English Football League players
Premier League players
England youth international footballers
English association football commentators
UEFA Cup winning players
FA Cup Final players